The 2021 Men's Hockey Junior Asia Cup was scheduled to be the 9th edition of the Men's Hockey Junior Asia Cup, the men's international under-21 field hockey championship of Asia organized by the Asian Hockey Federation. It was originally scheduled to take place from 4 to 12 June 2020 in Dhaka, Bangladesh.

The tournament served as the Asian qualifier for the 2021 FIH Junior World Cup, with the top four qualifying.

Due to the COVID-19 pandemic the tournament was postponed on 26 March 2020 to a yet to be determined date. In September 2020 it was announced that the tournament would take place from 21 to 30 January 2021. The tournament was postponed for the second time in November 2020 to July 2021. On 13 August 2021 the tournament as officially cancelled after it was again rescheduled.

Qualification
The top six teams from the 2015 edition qualified directly and they were joined by the top four from the 2019 Junior AHF Cup.

Qualified teams
The following teams have qualified for the tournament.

See also
2021 Women's Hockey Junior Asia Cup

References

Men's Hockey Junior Asia Cup
Junior Asia Cup
Hockey Junior Asia Cup
Hockey Asia Cup
Asia Cup